Łukasz Burliga (born 10 May 1988) is a Polish professional footballer who plays as a defender.

Career
In the 2007–08 season, he won the Młoda Ekstraklasa title with Wisła Kraków's youth team. During the 2008–09 season, he played 12 games and scored 12 goals in the Młoda Ekstraklasa.

During the second half of the 2008–09 season, he was loaned to I liga club Flota Świnoujście.

On 18 February 2016, he signed three-and-a-half year contract with Ekstraklasa side Jagiellonia Białystok. In 2019, he was signed by Wisła Kraków, and left them on 17 May 2021 to join the fifth tier club Wieczysta Kraków.

On 26 July 2022, he terminated his contract with Wieczysta and moved to Łódź for family reasons, where he joined the reserve team of Widzew Łódź. On 8 November 2022, he left the club by mutual consent.

Honours

Wisła Kraków (MESA)
 Młoda Ekstraklasa: 2007–08

Wisła Kraków
 Ekstraklasa: 2010–11

References

External links
 
 

1988 births
Living people
People from Sucha Beskidzka
Sportspeople from Lesser Poland Voivodeship
Association football defenders
Polish footballers
Poland under-21 international footballers
Ekstraklasa players
I liga players
IV liga players
Wisła Kraków players
Ruch Chorzów players
Flota Świnoujście players
Jagiellonia Białystok players
Wieczysta Kraków players